Ghana, since it independence from the British on 6 March 1957, has made great strides towards improving its health care facilities and the services offered in them. The Ghana Health Service, the health policy implementer of the Ministry of Health, has over the years developed the health care services offered to Ghanaians in the initial then (10) but now sixteen (16) administrative regions of the country.

The 10 regional hospitals
The regional hospitals in Ghana are tabulated below.

References